The Counts of Ribeira Grande was a title of nobility granted to a hereditary line of nobles from the island of São Miguel in the Portuguese archipelago of the Azores, most closely associated with the Gonçalves da Câmara familial line. The title was first conferred to D. Manuel Luís Baltazar da Câmara in 1662, and his branch of the Câmara dynastic family continued to receive the title long after the extinction of noble titles in 1910.

History

Although D. Manuel Luís Baltazar da Câmara, 9th Captain-Donatário of the island of São Miguel, was created first Count, by a decree of King Afonso VI of Portugal, issued on 15 September 1662, the origins of this title date to the fall of the Count of Vila Franca, and specifically Manuel da Câmara's father Rodrigo da Câmara. The 8th Captain-Donatário was plagued by scandals throughout his career. Unfortunately for the Count he eventually received unwanted attention from the Holy Office of the Inquisition, which arrested and tried the Count. Supported by various complaints, testimonies and even the defendant's own confession, the Count of Vila Franca was convicted, his family possession confiscated and incarcerated in the Convent of Cape St. Vincent until his death.

Although his wife was unable to liberate her husband, she was able to influence the Royal Cortes into restoring their family honours and possessions following her husband's death, thanks to her family connections as descendant of Vasco da Gama.  Her son was the direct beneficiary of this warming of ties. Owing to the tarnished nature of the Countship of Vila Franca, it was decided by the King to substitute Ribeira Grande for the blemished former provincial capital. The use of Vila Franca had already been a polemic decision in the first place, since Philip II of Spain had not consulted local politicians before instituting the honorific.

List of stewards

Counts
 D. Manuel Luís Baltazar da Câmara, 1st Count of Ribeira Grande (1630–1675);
 D. José Rodrigo da Câmara, 2nd Count of Ribeira Grande (1665–1724);
 D. Luís Manuel da Câmara, 3rd Count of Ribeira Grande (1685–1723);
 D. José da Câmara, 4th Count of Ribeira Grande (1712–1757);
 D. Guido Augusto da Câmara e Ataíde, 5th Count of Ribeira Grande (1718–1770);
 D. Luís António José Maria da Câmara, 6th Count of Ribeira Grande (1754–1802);
 D. José Maria Gonçalves Zarco da Câmara, 7th Count of Ribeira Grande (1784–1820);

Marquess
 D. Francisco de Sales Gonçalves Zarco da Câmara, 8th Count of Ribeira Grande (1819–1872), created 1st Marquis of Ribeira Grande by decree of King Pedro V of Portugal, issued on September 5, 1855
 D. José Maria Gonçalves Zarco da Câmara, 9th Count of Ribeira Grande (1843–1907);
 D. Vicente de Paula Gonçalves Zarco da Câmara, 10th Count of Ribeira Grande (1875–1946);

Pretendants
Following the fall of the monarchy, the Republican government abolished noble and honorific titles. Yet, some of the descendants still maintained those honorific titles and claims, including: D. José Maria Gonçalves Zarco da Câmara; D. José Vicente Gonçalves Zarco da Câmara; and D. José Cabral Gonçalves Zarco da Câmara.

Symbols
The Counts of Ribeira Grande used the heridtary coat-of-arms of the Counts of Vila Franca, that included the silver tower, surmounted by gold cross, and flanked by two grey wolves. Their motto at the time was PELA FÉ, PELO PRÍNCIPE, PELA PÁTRIA (For the faith, for the prince, for the fatherland).

See also
List of countships in Portugal
List of Marquesses in Portugal

References
Notes

Sources
 
 

Countships of Portugal
 
Gonçalves da Câmara family
1662 establishments in Portugal